Imrich Lyócsa (born 21 July 1963) is a Slovakian former para archer and wheelchair curler. Lyócsa has competed in four Summer Paralympics (2000, 2004, 2008 and 2012) and he competed in the 2018 Winter Paralympics as an alternate in the wheelchair curling team.

Wheelchair curling teams and events

References

External links

1963 births
Living people
Paralympic archers of Slovakia
Sportspeople from Košice
Archers at the 2000 Summer Paralympics
Archers at the 2004 Summer Paralympics
Archers at the 2008 Summer Paralympics
Archers at the 2012 Summer Paralympics
Medalists at the 2000 Summer Paralympics
Medalists at the 2004 Summer Paralympics
Paralympic medalists in archery
Paralympic gold medalists for Slovakia
Paralympic bronze medalists for Slovakia
Slovak male curlers
Slovak wheelchair curlers
Paralympic wheelchair curlers of Slovakia
Wheelchair curlers at the 2018 Winter Paralympics